The Court of the Vicar-General of the Province of Canterbury is responsible for granting marriage licences in the Province of Canterbury of the Church of England. The Vicar-General is distinct from the Dean of the Arches. The Registrars are the Joint Provincial Registrars. A Vicar-General is appointed by the Archbishop, and by certain other bishops to assist with such matters as ecclesiastical visitations. The Vicar-General of the Diocese is distinct from the Vicar-General of the Province. The Registry of the Vicar-General of the Province is 16 Beaumont Street, Oxford OX1 2LZ.

List of Vicars-General
Chancellor Timothy Briden, 2005-
Miss Sheila Cameron, QC 1983-2005
Michael Bradley Goodman 1977-1983
Sir Harold Kent, GCB QC 1971-1976
Rt Hon Sir Henry Willink, Bt MC QC 1955-1971
Sir Philip Wilbraham Baker Wilbraham, Bt. KBE 1934-1955
Henry Dashwood 1939-1948
Lewis Dibdin KC 1925-1934
Rt Hon Sir Charles Cripps, KCVO 1902-1924
Sir James Parker Deane c.1898
Sir Travers Twiss 1852-1872
Sir John Dodson 1849-1852
Rt Hon John Iltyd Nicholl 1838-1841
Rt Hon Sir John Nicholl 1834-1838

See also
 Court of the Vicar-General of the Province of York

References

Ecclesiastical courts
Church of England legislation